Allen is a city in the province of Río Negro, Argentina.

Allen was founded on 25 May 1910 by Patricio Piñeiro Sorondo. Its name was an homage to British engineer Charles Allen, a local landowner and member of the Gran Ferrocarril Sur railway company, who managed the construction of the city's train station.

The city is divided in half by a canal born in the Ingeniero Ballester Dam that brings water for irrigation from the Neuquén River. Its main traditional economic activity, which continues to be the most important, is the fruit industry. Allen is the National Capital of the Pear, hosting an annual National Festival of the Pear, and the seat of the Río Negro Fruit Market.

References
 
 Official Web Site. www.allen.gob.ar.
 Patagonia.com. Allen - General information.
 Patagonia Argentina. Allen.

Populated places in Río Negro Province
Populated places established in 1910